Suzy Prim (11 October 1896 – 7 July 1991) was a French actress.

She was born Suzanne Mariette Arduini in Paris and died in 1991 in Boulogne-Billancourt. She began her screen career as a child actress during the silent era.

Selected filmography

 Carmen (1914)
 Madame Coralie & C. (1914)
 Les écrits restent (1917)
 Le Noël d'Yveline (1918)
 Haine (1918)
 Appassionatamente (1919)
 Passionnément (1920)
 Il suo destino (1921)
 La reine Lumière (1921) - Huguette Landry ' Reine Lumière '
 Un drame d'amour (1921) - Diane d'Évremont
 L'aiglonne (1922) - Madame de Navailles
 Mon coeur et ses millions (1931) - Marguerite Mirgaudon
 Un petit trou pas cher (1934)
 La Bandera (1935) - (uncredited)
 Le bébé de l'escadron (1935) - Mathilde
 Marie des angoisses (1935) - Marfa
 Mayerling (1936) - La comtesse Larisch
 Samson (1936) - Grace Ritter
 La Peur (1936) - L'actrice
 Moutonnet (1936) - Dolly
 A Legionnaire (1936) - Maryse 
 The Brighton Twins (1936) - Clémentine Beaugérard
 27 Rue de la Paix (1936) - Jenny Clarens
 Au service du tsar (1936) - La comtesse Olga Belsky
 The Lower Depths (1936) - Vassilissa Kostyleva
 White Cargo (1937) - Estella
 La reine des resquilleuses (1937) - Véra
 Arsene Lupin, Detective (1937) - Olga Vauban
 The Call of Life (1937) - Madame Voisin
 Les anges noirs (1937) - Catherine
 Arsène Lupin contre Arsène Lupin (1937)
 Êtes-vous jalouse? (1938) - Germaine Moreuil
 Rail Pirates (1938) - Jeanne Rolland
 Princess Tarakanova (1938) - L'imperatrice Caterina II / L'impératrice Catherine II
 The Patriot (1938) - Anna Ostermann
 Alexis gentleman chauffeur (1938) - Madame Tabasco aka alias Margot Fontane
 Crossroads (1938) - Michèle Allain
 Berlingot and Company (1939) - Isabelle Grandville
 Farinet ou l'or dans la montagne (1939) - Joséphine Pellanda
 Cas de conscience (1939) - Madeleine Granval
 Strange Suzy (1941) - Suzy
 The Benefactor (1942) - Irène Berger
 Les petits riens (1942) - Louise
 Après l'orage (1943) - Catherine Grand
 The Heart of a Nation (1943) - Estelle Froment adulte
 Shop Girls of Paris (1943) - Madame Desforges
 The London Man (1943) - Camélia
 La Rabouilleuse (1944) - Flore Brazier, la rabouilleuse
 La Malibran (1944) - La comtesse Merlin
 La collection Ménard (1944) - Madame Ménard
 Majestic Hotel Cellars (1945) - Émilie Petersen
 Le cabaret du grand large (1946) - Reine
 Triple enquête (1948) - Irène
 Au royaume des cieux (1949) - Mademoiselle Chamblas
 Clear the Ring (1950) - La comtesse Barinoff
 The Two Girls (1951) - Mademoiselle Bénazer
 Trafic sur les dunes (1951) - Madame Estelle
 The Case of Doctor Galloy  (1951) - L'amie de Mme Guérin
 Follow That Man (1953) - Mme Olga
 Les Compagnes de la nuit (1953) - Pierrette
 Le Feu dans la peau (1954) - Maria, la parfumeuse
 The Babes Make the Law (1955) - Flora - la mère
 Mémoires d'un flic (1956) - Lola
 Lorsque l'enfant paraît (1956) - Madeleine Lonant
 Douze heures d'horloge (1959) - Madame César
 Les lionceaux (1960) - Blanche Eroli
 Profession: Aventuriers (1973) - Eléonore
 Body of My Enemy (1976) - La mère de Marie-Adélaïde (final film role)

References

External links

1896 births
1991 deaths
French film actresses
French silent film actresses
Actresses from Paris
20th-century French actresses